This article details the Wigan Warriors rugby league football club's 2015 season. This was the Warriors' 20th season in the Super League.

Preseason  friendlies

Wigan score is first.

World Club Series

Super League

Regular season

Matches

Table

Super 8's

Matches

Table

2015 play-offs

Player appearances

 = Injured

 = Suspended

Challenge Cup

Player appearances

Squad Statistics

 Appearances and points include (Super League, Challenge Cup and play-offs) as of 10 October 2015.

 = Injured
 = Suspended

Transfers

In

Out

References

External links
Wigan Warriors Website
Wigan Warriors - SL Website

Wigan Warriors seasons
Wigan Warriors season